Kwilu, also known as the House of Kwilu (Portuguese: Coulo), was a kanda or royal lineage of the Kingdom of Kongo.

Origins
Prior to the rise of the Kwilu kanda, the Kilukeni kanda or House of Lukeni had ruled Kongo since its inception around the end of the 14th century.	After the death of King Henrique I, power passed into the hands of Álvaro I. Álvaro I was Henrique I's stepson, which probably explains why a new kanda was formed when he managed to inherit the throne. He came to power in 1567 and named his royal house for the small district in which he was born north of the capital.

Reign
With the exception of the Jaga invasion during the first years of Álvaro I's reign, the House of Kwilu ruled the kingdom without interruption until 4 May 1622. It was then that Álvaro III died leaving a son that was too old to be elected. The Kinkanga kanda took over from then but was ousted and replaced with Ambrósio I putting the Kwilu kanda back in power.  King Ambrósio was killed during a massive revolt and succeeded by the child Álvaro IV, the last king from the House of Kwilu.  No members of the Kwilu gained the throne after 1636, and Kongo was dominated by warring houses claiming descent from Afonso I or his relatives.

References

See also
Kilukeni
Kingdom of Kongo
List of rulers of Kongo
Kinkanga

Manikongo of Kongo
Former monarchies of Africa
Former countries in Africa